Cystosoma saundersii, commonly known as the bladder cicada, is a species of cicada native to northeastern New South Wales and southeastern Queensland in Australia.

Cystosoma saundersii are nocturnal and employ camouflage as a defense tactic.

Life Cycle
Their median life cycle from egg to natural adult death is around four years.

References

Hemiptera of Australia
Insects described in 1842
Chlorocystini